Oxalophagus oxalicus, previously known as Clostridium oxalicus, is a bacterium in the family of Paenibacillaceae.

References

External links
Type strain of Oxalophagus oxalicus at BacDive -  the Bacterial Diversity Metadatabase

Paenibacillaceae
Bacteria described in 1990